This list is of Major Sites Protected for their Historical and Cultural Value at the National Level in the Province of Jiangsu, People's Republic of China.

  

 

 

  

  

 
 

 
 
 

 

  
 

 
 
 

 

 
 

|}

See also

 Principles for the Conservation of Heritage Sites in China

References

 
Jiangsu